Stephen David Williams  (born 15 April 1976 in Leamington Spa) is an English rower and double Olympic champion. In April and May 2011, Williams walked to the North Pole and achieved the summit of Mount Everest.

Education 
Williams was educated at Monkton Combe School, Bath, where he began rowing aged 13.  He attended Oxford Brookes University where he studied History and Town planning.

International career 
Williams made his full international debut in 1998 at the age of 22. He partnered Fred Scarlett in the coxless pair, and came sixth in his first world championships. A year later he partnered Simon Dennis in the same event, this time finishing fifth. In 2000 both Scarlett and Dennis won seats in the GB Eight for the Olympics in Sydney but Williams just missed out, and instead was a member of the Coxed Four which won a gold medal at the World Championships in Zagreb for non-Olympic events.
In 2001 he was again world champion, this time in the Coxless Four, and won the silver medal in the same discipline in both 2002 and 2003.

With Matthew Pinsent, James Cracknell and Ed Coode, Williams won Olympic gold at the 2004 Summer Olympics in Athens in the men's coxless four.

Williams was the only member of the 2004 Olympic crew to continue racing in the 2005 season, joining Alex Partridge, Pete Reed and Andrew Triggs Hodge in the coxless four, again winning the World Championship that year and in 2006, before coming in fourth at the 2007 world championships. In 2008, Partridge was replaced in the four by Cambridge Blue Tom James, and - despite an injury-torn season - the quartet became Olympic Champions, defeating the Australian boat by 1.28s on the day dubbed 'Super Saturday' by the media owing to the large GB medal haul. The Australians led for much of the race before a push by the British boat overhauled them in the last 400 m.

Current occupation 
Williams was appointed as a fitness consultant to Andy Liddell for Ipswich Town Football Club on 3 July 2012.

Having been appointed a Member of the Order of the British Empire (MBE) in the 2005 New Year Honours, Williams was promoted to Officer of the Order of the British Empire (OBE) in the 2009 New Year Honours.

On 22 January 2010 he announced his retirement from rowing.  

He has been welcomed back to Monkton Combe School on several occasions, rowing in a Monkton Bluefriars old  boys' boat at a school regatta.

Achievements
 Olympic Medals: 2 Gold
 World Championship Medals: 4 Gold, 2 Silver

Olympic Games
 2008 – Gold, Coxless Four (with Andy Hodge, Pete Reed, Tom James)
 2004 – Gold, Coxless Four (with Matthew Pinsent, James Cracknell, Ed Coode)

World Championships
 2007 – 4th, Coxless Four (with Pete Reed, Alex Partridge and Andrew Triggs Hodge)
 2006 – Gold, Coxless Four (with Pete Reed, Alex Partridge and Andrew Triggs Hodge)
 2005 – Gold, Coxless Four (with Pete Reed, Alex Partridge and Andrew Triggs Hodge)
 2003 – Silver, Coxless Four (with Josh West, Rick Dunn and Toby Garbett)
 2002 – Silver, Coxless Four (with Josh West, Rick Dunn and Toby Garbett)
 2001 – Gold, Coxless Four (with Ed Coode, Rick Dunn and Toby Garbett)
 2000 – Gold, Coxed Four (with Alistair Potts, Rick Dunn, Toby Garbett and Graham Smith)
 1999 – 5th, Coxless Pair (with Simon Dennis)
 1998 – 6th, Coxless Pair (with Fred Scarlett)

See also
 Leander Club (where Steve Williams is a member)

References

External links
 BBC Oxford – Steve Williams profile

1976 births
Living people
Sportspeople from Leamington Spa
People educated at Monkton Combe School
English male rowers
English Olympic medallists
Olympic gold medallists for Great Britain
Olympic rowers of Great Britain
Rowers at the 2004 Summer Olympics
Rowers at the 2008 Summer Olympics
Officers of the Order of the British Empire
Alumni of Oxford Brookes University
Olympic medalists in rowing
Medalists at the 2008 Summer Olympics
Medalists at the 2004 Summer Olympics
Members of Leander Club
British summiters of Mount Everest
World Rowing Championships medalists for Great Britain